Bathytoma finlayi is an extinct species of sea snail, a marine gastropod mollusk in the family Borsoniidae.

Distribution
This extinct marine species is endemic to New Zealand .

Description

References

 Maxwell, P.A. (2009). Cenozoic Mollusca. pp 232–254 in Gordon, D.P. (ed.) New Zealand inventory of biodiversity. Volume one. Kingdom Animalia: Radiata, Lophotrochozoa, Deuterostomia. Canterbury University Press, Christchurch. 
 Laws, C.R. 1939 The molluscan faunule at Pakaurangi Point, Kaipara. No. 1. Transactions and Proceedings of the Royal Society of New Zealand, 68(4): 466-503

finlayi
Gastropods of New Zealand
Gastropods described in 1939